Liujiadian Town is a town located inside of Pinggu District, Beijing, China. It borders Dahuashan Town to the northeast, Wangxinzhuang and Yukou Tonws to the south, and Dongshaoqu Town to the west. Its total population was 7,155 in the 2020 census.

The name Liujiadian comes from Liujiadian Village, the seat of government for this town.

History

Administrative divisions 
As of 2021, 14 villages constituted Liujiadian Town. They can be seen in the following table:

Gallery

See also 

 List of township-level divisions of Beijing

References 

Pinggu District
Towns in Beijing